Violence has been a part of ice hockey since at least the early 1900s. According to the book Hockey: A People's History, in 1904 alone, four players were killed during hockey games from the frequent brawls and violent stickwork.

More modern examples of violence include brawls, bench clearing brawls, fighting, fan involvement, physical abuse of officials and deliberately injuring opponents. Violent actions such as kicking, hitting from behind and prohibited stickwork, are penalized with suspensions or fines. Fighting, or fisticuffs, is also penalized but is considered by many hockey enthusiasts, particularly in North America, to be quite distinct from stick-swinging or other violent acts. They regard fighting as an entrenched, acceptable and integral part of the game.

On the ice, referees may impose penalties for prohibited activities. Off the ice, the National Hockey League (NHL) sometimes fines, suspends or expels players. The criminal justice system has also  occasionally charged and convicted players. As a result, hockey has become much more regulated and the violent element much more controlled. This has been aided, in no small part, by dramatic increases in disciplinary processes and technology allowing for a high level of scrutiny of any event which occurs.

History
Early hockey in particular was noted for its extreme violence, to the point where two players were killed in three years during brawls.  In both cases, the accused assailants were acquitted, but these and other bloody incidents led to calls for the sport to clean up its act or be banned along with the likes of cockfighting.  The worst of the violence waned, particularly with the advent of regulations for quasi-legal fisticuffs, though incidents continue to occur from time to time.

Cully Wilson, right winger with the Seattle Metropolitans, slashed Vancouver Millionaires center Mickey MacKay over the mouth during the 1919 PCHA season. MacKay suffered a fractured jaw and missed the rest of the season. When the season was over PCHA chief disciplinarian Frank Patrick banned Wilson from the league, and Wilson never played in the PCHA again.

Billy Coutu was the first, and to date only, player banned from the NHL for life for violence in 1927; he assaulted referee Jerry Laflamme and tackled referee Billy Bell before starting a bench-clearing brawl during a Stanley Cup game between the Boston Bruins and Ottawa Senators, apparently on the orders of Bruins Head Coach Art Ross. The NHL's first president, Frank Calder, expelled Coutu from the NHL for life; the ban was lifted after two-and-a-half years, but Coutu never played in the NHL again.

Other incidents include the December 12, 1933, event when Eddie Shore rammed Toronto Maple Leafs star Ace Bailey from behind, causing Bailey to strike his head on the ice; Bailey never played hockey again. More recently, controversy and criminal charges have resulted from violent attacks by Marty McSorley, Todd Bertuzzi and Chris Simon.

Players who are banned in the American Hockey League (AHL) for violence are not permitted in the ECHL, and vice versa, because of their agreements with the Professional Hockey Players' Association.

In January 2012, David Johnston, the Governor General of Canada, said that violence such as headshots, high-sticking and fighting should not be part of the sport.

Reports investigating violence
There have been two major Canadian reports on violence in hockey. In 1974, William McMurtry provided a report for the Government of Ontario entitled Investigation and Inquiry into Violence in Amateur Hockey. In 2000, Bernie Pascall prepared a report for the Government of British Columbia entitled Eliminating Violence in Hockey.

On-ice incidents resulting in charges

1905 – Allan Loney was charged with manslaughter in the on-ice clubbing death of Alcide Laurin.  Loney claimed self-defence, and was found not guilty.
1907 – Ottawa Hockey Club players Harry Smith, Alf Smith and Charles Spittal were charged with assault after beating Montreal Wanderers players Hod Stuart, Ernie "Moose" Johnson and Cecil Blachford with their sticks. Harry Smith was acquitted while Spittal and Alf Smith were each fined $20.
1907 – Ottawa Victorias player Charles Masson was charged with manslaughter after Cornwall player Owen McCourt died of a head wound sustained in a brawl.  Masson was found not guilty on the grounds that there was no way to know which blow had killed McCourt.
1908 – Charles Spittal (of Renfrew Riversides) arrested for knocking out Oren Frood of Pembroke (UOVHL) on January 17, 1908. Charge was withdrawn on January 20, 1908.
1910 – Rusty Crawford, while a member of the Prince Albert Mintos, assaulted Reginald Brehaut of the Saskatoon Strathconas in a game in Saskatoon on January 11, 1910. Crawford was later found guilty of assault on January 19 in a Saskatoon city police court and fined $5 and costs.
1912 – Edgar Dey was fined $50 by Halifax magistrate's court in Nova Scotia for assaulting Patsy Séguin in a January 5 MPHL game between the Halifax Socials and Halifax Crescents. Dey himself died the following month on February 13 from chest injuries thought to stem partly from his tussle with Séguin.
1912 – Sprague Cleghorn of the Montreal Wanderers pleaded guilty in a Toronto court of assaulting Newsy Lalonde of the Montreal Canadiens with his stick in a pre-season exhibition game at the Arena Gardens in Toronto on December 21, 1912. Cleghorn was fined $50 by Judge Morgan on December 28. 
1915 – A riot broke out at the end of a game on January 2, 1915 between Ottawa College and the Cleveland Athletic Club at the Elysium Arena in Cleveland, and Ottawa College goaltender Vincent Doran was arrested on a charge for assaulting Cleveland player Elmer Irving. Irving refused to prosecute and the case was dropped in a Cleveland police court on January 4.
1915 – Roy McGiffin of the Toronto Blueshirts and Art Ross of the Ottawa Senators were involved in a fist fight with each other in a NHA game between the two clubs on February 17, 1915 which had both players arrested. They were released on $100 bail each, and later appeared in court where they were fined $1 and costs. McGiffin and Ross tossed a coin to determine who would pay the $8 bill, with McGiffin ending up paying for both.
1916 – Skene Ronan of the Montreal Canadiens assaulted Alf Skinner of the Toronto Blueshirts in a NHA game between the two clubs on January 22, 1916 which had him arrested by police and taken to the Agnes Street station in Toronto, although he was later released on $200 bail. The incident went to trial and Ronan was acquitted of the charge on January 31 before Judge Winchester in Toronto, with Canadiens manager George Kennedy acting as a witness for the defense.
1918 – Joe Hall of the Montreal Canadiens and Alf Skinner of the Toronto Arenas were both arrested after a NHL game on January 28, 1918 after they had hit each other violently with their sticks. Hall and Skinner appeared in a Toronto court together on January 29 and both were released after being handed a suspended sentence. 
1922 – Sprague Cleghorn of the Montreal Canadiens injured three Ottawa Senators players (Frank Nighbor, Eddie Gerard and Cy Denneny) in a game on February 1, leading Ottawa police to offer to arrest him.
1969 – In a pre-season game held in Ottawa, Ted Green of the Boston Bruins and Wayne Maki of the St. Louis Blues engaged in a violent, stick-swinging brawl. A fractured skull and brain damage caused Green to miss the entire 1969–70 season.  The NHL suspended Maki for 30 days and Green for 13 games. Both men were acquitted in court.
1975 – Dan Maloney of the Detroit Red Wings was charged with assault causing bodily harm after he attacked Brian Glennie of the Toronto Maple Leafs from behind. In exchange for a no-contest plea, Maloney did community service work and was banned from playing in Toronto for two seasons.
1975 – Police charged Boston Bruins player Dave Forbes with aggravated assault after a fight with Henry Boucha of the Minnesota North Stars. After a nine-day trial ended with a hung jury, charges against Forbes were dropped. Boucha suffered blurred vision from the incident and never fully recovered.
1976 – Philadelphia Flyers players Joe Watson, Mel Bridgman, Don Saleski and Bob "Hound" Kelly were charged with assault after using their hockey sticks as weapons in a violent playoff game between the Flyers and the Toronto Maple Leafs in which fans had been taunting the Flyers players and spitting at them. Bridgman was acquitted, but the other three Flyers were found guilty of simple assault.
1976 – Calgary Cowboys forward Rick Jodzio plead guilty to a charge of assault following a cross-check to the head of Quebec Nordiques player Marc Tardif during the World Hockey Association (WHA) playoffs. The hit led to a 20-minute bench clearing brawl.
1977 – Dave "Tiger" Williams of the Toronto Maple Leafs hit the Pittsburgh Penguins' Dennis Owchar with his stick. He was charged with assault, but acquitted.
1980 – Jimmy Mann of the Winnipeg Jets left the bench and sucker-punched Pittsburgh Penguin Paul Gardner, breaking Gardner's jaw in two places. Mann was fined $500 and given a suspended sentence in Winnipeg.
1988 – Dino Ciccarelli hit Maple Leafs defenceman Luke Richardson with his stick. Charged and convicted of assault, he was sentenced to one day in jail and fined $1,000.
1992 – Enrico Ciccone of the IHL's Kalamazoo Wings was arrested on a battery charge after San Diego Gulls photographer Essy Ghavameddini was cut and received a deep bruise below his left eye that required stitches. Ciccone assaulted him after entering the penalty box where Ghavameddini was photographing the game from.
1998 – Jesse Boulerice of the Plymouth Whalers was suspended for the rest of the playoffs after violently swinging his stick at Guelph Storm forward Andrew Long. Boulerice was charged with assault as a result of the incident.
1999 – Dean Trboyevich of the Anchorage Aces (West Coast Hockey League) cross-checked Jacques Mailhot of the Fresno Falcons in the face and was arrested at his hotel after the game, and was later released on a $20,000 bail.
2000 – Marty McSorley of the Boston Bruins hit Vancouver Canuck Donald Brashear in the head with his stick in the waning moments of the game, after losing a fight to Brashear earlier in the game. McSorley was convicted of assault with a weapon and given an 18-month conditional discharge.
2004 – In the Todd Bertuzzi–Steve Moore incident, Bertuzzi of the Vancouver Canucks sucker-punched Moore of the Colorado Avalanche in the back of the head, knocking him unconscious. The pair then fell to the ice with Bertuzzi's weight crushing Moore face-first into the ice, followed by several players from both teams further piling onto the mêlée.  Moore sustained three fractured vertebrae, a grade three concussion, vertebral ligament damage, stretching of the brachial plexus nerves and facial lacerations. Bertuzzi was charged by police and given a conditional discharge after pleading guilty to assault causing bodily harm. His suspension resulted in a loss of $500,000 in pay and the Canucks were fined $250,000. Bertuzzi was re-instated in 2005, after a 20 game suspension and an international ban during the 2004-05 lockout season. A civil suit filed by Moore, seeking CAD$68 million in damages and loss of income, was settled on August 19, 2014. The terms of this settlement are confidential.
2015 – During the warm up before a qualifier to the SHL, André Deveaux from Rögle BK assaulted Västerås IK's unsuspecting Per Helmersson. Deveaux swung his stick and slashed Helmersson twice. The attack was retaliation for a hit from behind by Helmersson in the game before, which Deveaux claimed caused him a minor concussion. Both players could complete both games, and Deveaux was only disciplined after the game. Deveaux was charged for the attack, but the charges were later dropped.
2015 – During an Allsvenskan (Sweden's second tier league) game on March 5, 2015 Rögle BK forward Jakob Lilja cross-checked Malmö Redhawks defenceman Jens Olsson from behind in the neck area. Lilja received a 10-game suspension, with four of the games converted into a monetary fine as per custom. Over three years later, on July 10, 2018 the Supreme Court of Sweden, after the case had first gone through the lower District Court of Malmö, handed Lilja a one-month probation sentence while removing the earlier imposed monetary fine because Lilja had already been imposed a fine by the ice hockey Disciplinary Committee.

Longest suspensions
All of these incidents are in the NHL of the United States and Canada, unless noted otherwise.

See also
Battle of the Hockey Enforcers
Fighting in ice hockey

References

Bibliography

Notes

External links
A brief history of stick violence CBC. October 6, 2000. (cbc.ca)
NHL Suspension List Canadian Press. March 11, 2007. (thehockeynews.com)
History of criminal charges on ice Canadian Press. 24 June 2004. (tsn.ca)

 
Ice hockey
Violence in sports